The EUROPARC Federation, also known as the "Federation of Nature and National Parks of Europe", is an independent, non-governmental organisation which aims to work with national parks across Europe in enhancing protection. Founded in 1973 in Basel, it moved its headquarters to Grafenau, Bavaria in 1986 and again to Regensburg in 2010. As of 2013 it represents some 365 parks in 36 countries.

Nature knows no boundaries and EUROPARC therefore facilitates international co-operation in all aspects of protected area management to further improve and conserve our shared natural inheritance. The EUROPARC Federation endeavours to exchange expertise, experience and best practice as well as to collaborate with others to ensure the value and meaning of protected areas is at the heart of Europe.

The key aims of the EUROPARC Federation are:
 Promote good practice in the management of protected areas
 Facilitate the establishment of new protected areas
 Raise the profile of protected areas as a vital means of safeguarding many of the continent's most valuable natural heritage assets, and thereby to increase support for their future protection
 Influence the future development of public policies and programmes, especially with the European Union, to the benefit of protected areas' objectives.

References

External links

Environmental organisations based in Germany